PAGER (Prompt Assessment of Global Earthquakes for Response) is a monitoring system for earthquakes. The service is operated by the US Geological Survey, with headquarters in Golden, Colorado.

It provides fatality and economic loss impact estimates, following significant earthquakes worldwide.

See also
Earthquake casualty estimation

References

External links
PAGER – Prompt Assessment of Global Earthquakes for Response – USGS
PAGER—Rapid Assessment of an Earthquake’s Impact – USGS

Disaster management tools
Seismological observatories, organisations and projects